The Houston Mayoral Election of 2005 took place on November 8, 2005. Incumbent Mayor Bill White was re-elected to a second term. Officially the race was non-partisan, but Mayor White is a historical Democrat.

Candidates

Incumbent Mayor Bill White
Gladys House
Jack Terence
Luis Ullrich
Anthony Dutrow

Results

See also

2009 Houston mayoral election
Elections in Texas

Mayoral election, 2005
Houston mayoral
Houston
2005
Non-partisan elections